The Monash  Warriors Gridiron Club are a gridiron team located in Melbourne, Victoria. They currently field two senior Men's, a Juniors teams and a Women's team in the Gridiron Victoria league.

History
The Nunawading Warriors Gridiron Club was founded in 1985 by the late  James White. The Warriors won the minor premiership in 1987, however were eliminated in the finals series with two consecutive losses. The  Warriors would have to wait a decade before they returned to the finals  series, which happened in 1998 with a semi final loss to the now defunct  Banyule Panthers. From this point, the Warriors have been the  pre-eminent team in Gridiron Victoria, going on to play finals football every year except 2003 and winning 11 of the 15 Vicbowls they have contested since 2000. With a win in 2010, the Warriors  performed a 3-peat of State Championships. They also completed their second 3-Peat after defeating the Buccaneers in 2012, 2013 & 2014.

Our Division 2 Barbarians also were able to win their first Championship in 2013. The Warriors made history by winning both the Division I Vicbowl and Division II Championship in the same season (Currently there are no other clubs with 2 teams).

The Warriors Junior program has also had great success in winning the 2003, 2009, and most recently in 2016 Junior Championship.

Notable players 
Adam Gotsis - Denver Broncos

VIC BOWL CHAMPIONS

DIV II CHAMPIONS (BARBARIANS)

JUNIOR VIC BOWL CHAMPIONS 

Our Mission Statement:

“The Warriors Gridiron Football Club is a forum for the community to  enjoy and gain exposure to the sport of American Football. We are here to support all of our members and their families.”

See also

References

External links

Sporting clubs in Melbourne
American football teams established in 1987
American football teams in Victoria (Australia)
University and college sports clubs in Australia
Monash University